Moody Island is an ice-covered island  long, between Kizer Island and Steventon Island in the Sulzberger Ice Shelf, Marie Byrd Land, Antarctica. It was mapped from surveys by the United States Geological Survey and from U.S. Navy air photos (1959–65), and was named by the Advisory Committee on Antarctic Names for E.L. Moody, a dog-driver with the Byrd Antarctic Expedition (1933–35).

See also 
 List of Antarctic and sub-Antarctic islands

References

Islands of Marie Byrd Land